Veit Khisl (Slovenized as Vid Khissel) was a politician in Slovenia during the first half of the 16th century, when it was under the Holy Roman Empire. He became mayor of Ljubljana in 1533. He was succeeded by Hans Weilhammer in 1536.

References 

Year of birth missing
Year of death missing
16th-century Slovenian people
Mayors of places in the Holy Roman Empire
Mayors of Ljubljana